Red bean is a common name for several plants and may refer to:

 Adzuki bean (Vigna angularis), commonly used in Japanese, Korean, and Chinese cuisine, particularly as red bean paste
 Kidney bean,  red variety of Phaseolus vulgaris, commonly used in Indian and North American cuisine, such as chili con carne.
 Vigna umbellata, a species of legume whose seeds are red
 Dysoxylum rufum, a rainforest tree in the Mahogany family
 Dysoxylum mollissimum subsp. molle, a rainforest tree

See also 

 Red Beans (album), a 1976 album by Jimmy McGrif